In probability theory, the optional stopping theorem (or sometimes Doob's optional sampling theorem, for American probabilist Joseph Doob) says that, under certain conditions, the expected value of a martingale at a stopping time is equal to its initial expected value. Since martingales can be used to model the wealth of a gambler participating in a fair game, the optional stopping theorem says that, on average, nothing can be gained by stopping play based on the information obtainable so far (i.e., without looking into the future). Certain conditions are necessary for this result to hold true. In particular, the theorem applies to doubling strategies.

The optional stopping theorem is an important tool of mathematical finance in the context of the fundamental theorem of asset pricing.

Statement 
A discrete-time version of the theorem is given below:

Let  be a discrete-time martingale and  a stopping time with values in }, both with respect to a filtration . Assume that one of the following three conditions holds:
() The stopping time  is almost surely bounded, i.e., there exists a constant  such that  a.s.
() The stopping time  has finite expectation and the conditional expectations of the absolute value of the martingale increments are almost surely bounded, more precisely,  and there exists a constant  such that  almost surely on the event } for all .
() There exists a constant  such that  a.s. for all  where  denotes the minimum operator.
Then  is an almost surely well defined random variable and 

Similarly, if the stochastic process  is a submartingale or a supermartingale and one of the above conditions holds, then

for a submartingale, and

for a supermartingale.

In the previous paragraphs, 
denotes the set of natural integers, including zero.

Remark 
Under condition () it is possible that  happens with positive probability.

Applications
The optional stopping theorem can be used to prove the impossibility of successful betting strategies for a gambler with a finite lifetime (which gives condition ()) or a house limit on bets (condition ()).  Suppose that the gambler can wager up to c dollars on a fair coin flip at times 1, 2, 3, etc., winning his wager if the coin comes up heads and losing it if the coin comes up tails.  Suppose further that he can quit whenever he likes, but cannot predict the outcome of gambles that haven't happened yet.  Then the gambler's fortune over time is a martingale, and the time  at which he decides to quit (or goes broke and is forced to quit) is a stopping time.  So the theorem says that .  In other words, the gambler leaves with the same amount of money on average as when he started.  (The same result holds if the gambler, instead of having a house limit on individual bets, has a finite limit on his line of credit or how far in debt he may go, though this is easier to show with another version of the theorem.)
Suppose a random walk starting at  that goes up or down by one with equal probability on each step. If it is known that the expected time at which the walk ends is finite (say, from Markov chain theory), the optional stopping theorem predicts that the expected stop position is equal to the initial position . Solving  for the probability  that the walk reaches  before  gives .
If  is the time at which  first reaches , then . This gives .
Care must be taken, however, to ensure that one of the conditions of the theorem hold. Therefore, the expectation value  must also be , seemingly in violation of the theorem which would give . The failure of the optional stopping theorem shows that all three of the conditions fail.

Proof
Let  denote the stopped process, it is also a martingale (or a submartingale or supermartingale, respectively). Under condition () or (), the random variable  is well defined. Under condition () the stopped process  is bounded, hence by Doob's martingale convergence theorem it converges a.s. pointwise to a random variable which we call .

If condition () holds, then the stopped process  is bounded by the constant random variable . Otherwise, writing the stopped process as

gives  for all , where

.

By the monotone convergence theorem

.

If condition () holds, then this series only has a finite number of non-zero terms, hence  is integrable.

If condition () holds, then we continue by inserting a conditional expectation and using that the event } is known at time  (note that  is assumed to be a stopping time with respect to the filtration), hence

where a representation of the expected value of non-negative integer-valued random variables is used for the last equality.

Therefore, under any one of the three conditions in the theorem, the stopped process is dominated by an integrable random variable .

By the martingale property of the stopped process,

hence

Similarly, if  is a submartingale or supermartingale, respectively, change the equality in the last two formulas to the appropriate inequality.

References

External links
 Doob's Optional Stopping Theorem

Probability theorems
Theorems in statistics
Articles containing proofs
Martingale theory